The 1934 Detroit Lions season was the fifth season in franchise history. It was the first season the team played in Detroit; the franchise had previously played as the Portsmouth Spartans in Portsmouth, Ohio, a city with a population of approximately 40,000. Under head coach Potsy Clark, the Lions won their first ten games (of which the first seven were shutouts) before losing three straight games to end the season. They finished in second place in the NFL Western Division behind the undefeated Chicago Bears. The lions started 10-0 as did the Bears, but Detroit lost the 3 remaining games whilst Chicago won their 3 remaining fixtures.

Three Lions ranked among the NFL leaders in rushing yardage: Dutch Clark with 763 yards (third), Ernie Caddel with 528 yards (fifth), and Ace Gutowsky with 517 yards (seventh). Two Lions also ranked among the league leaders in points scored: Dutch Clark with 73 points (second) and Glenn Presnell with 63 points (third).  Clark also led the NFL with 1,146 yards of total offense and ranked among the league leaders with 13 extra points made (second) and 383 passing yards (fourth). Harry Ebding led the NFL with 264 receiving yards and 22.0 receiving yards per game.

Schedule

Standings

Game summaries

Game 1: New York Giants

On September 23, 1934, the Lions opened their first season in Detroit with a 9–0 victory over the New York Giants before a crowd of 12,000 persons at the University of Detroit Stadium. Dutch Clark drop-kicked a field goal from the 20-yard line in the third quarter, and Father Lumpkin intercepted an Ed Danowski pass and returned it 45 yards for the Lions' first touchdown. On offense, the Lions gained 187 yards of total offense, 185 rushing yards and only two passing yards (one completion on three passes). On defense, the Lions held Harry Newman's Giants to 153 yards, 109 rushing and 36 passing (two completions and two interceptions on 18 passes). The Lions fumbled five times in the game and gave up 45 yards on penalties.

The Lions' starting lineup in their first game in Detroit was as follows: Harry Ebding (right end), George Christensen (right tackle), Ox Emerson (right guard), Chuck Bernard (center), Maury Bodenger (left guard), Jack Johnson (left tackle), Bill McKalip (left end), Dutch Clark (quarterback), Ernie Caddell (right halfback), Father Lumpkin (left halfback), and Ace Gutowsky (fullback). Detroit substitutes who appeared in the game were backs Frank Christensen, Glenn Presnell, and Bob Rowe, ends Buster Mitchell and John Schneller, and tackles Sam Knox and Bob Emerick.

Game 2: Chicago Cardinals

On September 30, 1934, the Lions defeated the Chicago Cardinals, 6–0, before a crowd of 7,000 at University of Detroit Stadium. Dutch Clark scored on a two-yard touchdown run five minutes into the game; Clark then missed on his drop-kick for the extra point. Father Lumpkin had a key interception to stop a Chicago drive at midfield. The Lions were held to 119 rushing yards in the game. A group of Detroit Tigers, including Mickey Cochrane, Schoolboy Rowe, Elon Hogsett, and Elden Auker, watched the game from a midfield box before the start of the 1934 World Series three days later.

The Lions' starting lineup against the Cardinals was Harry Ebding (right end), George Christensen (right tackle), Ox Emerson (right guard), Chuck Bernard (center), Maury Bodenger (left guard), Jack Johnson (left tackle), Bill McKalip (left end), Dutch Clark (quarterback), Ernie Caddell (right halfback), Father Lumpkin (left halfback), and Frank Christensen (fullback). Detroit substitutes who appeared in the game were backs Ace Gutowsky, Glenn Presnell, Bob Rowe, and Bill McWilliams; ends Buster Mitchell and John Schneller; guards Thomas Hupke and Russ Lay; and center Clare Randolph.

Game 3: at Green Bay Packers

On October 7, 1934, the Lions defeated the Green Bay Packers, 3–0, before a crowd of 8,000 at City Stadium in Green Bay, Wisconsin. The only points of the game were scored on a 54-yard field goal kicked from placement by backup quarterback Glenn Presnell. The Green Bay Press-Gazette reported that Presnell's kick was "probably the longest kick for a score in the record" of NFL competition. On offense, the Lions gained 172 total yards, 101 rushing (led by Ace Gutowsky with 54 yards), and 71 passing (five completions out of 22 passes, including a 30-yard gain on a pass from Dutch Clark to Ernie Caddel).  On defense, the Lions held the Packers to 123 total yards, 115 rushing and eight passing (two completions and one interceptions on eight passes).

The Lions' starting lineup against the Packers was John Schneller (right end), George Christensen (right tackle), Ox Emerson (right guard), Clare Randolph (center), Maury Bodenger (left guard), Jack Johnson (left tackle), Buster Mitchell (left end), Dutch Clark (quarterback), Ernie Caddell (right halfback), Father Lumpkin (left halfback), and Frank Christensen (fullback). Detroit substitutes who appeared in the game were Bill McKalip (left end), Chuck Bernard (center), Russ Lay (right guard), Ace Gutowsky (left halfback), Glenn Presnell (quarterback), Harry Ebding (end),  Ray Richards, Thomas Hupke, and Bob Emerick.

Game 4: at Philadelphia Eagles

On October 7, 1934, the Lions defeated the Philadelphia Eagles, 10–0, before a crowd of 10,000 at the Baker Bowl in Philadelphia. Ernie Caddel ran nine yards for the game's only touchdown in the second quarter, and Dutch Clark drop-kicked the extra point. Caddel also had the longest run of the game at 53 yards. Clark added a field goal from the 25-yard line in the fourth quarter. On offense, the Lions rushed for 145 yards and tallied 36 passing yards (four completions out of 18 passes). On defense, the Lions held the Eagles to 131 rushing yards (80 by Swede Hanson) and five completions on 26 passes for 20 yards.

The Lions' starting lineup against the Eagles was John Schneller (right end), George Christensen (right tackle), Ox Emerson (right guard), Clare Randolph (center), Maury Bodenger (left guard), Jack Johnson (left tackle), Buster Mitchell (left end), Glenn Presnell (quarterback), Ernie Caddell (right halfback), Frank Christensen (left halfback), and Ace Gutowsky (fullback). Detroit substitutes who appeared in the game were McKalip (left end), Emerick (left tackle), Hupke (left guard), Chuck Bernard (center), Richards (right guard), Knox (right tackle), Ebding (right end), Dutch Clark (quarterback), Father Lumpkin (left halfback), Bill McWilliams (right halfback), and Bob Rowe (fullback).

Game 5: Boston Redskins

On October 17, 1934, in a Wednesday night game, the Lions defeated the Boston Redskins, 24–0, before a crowd of 12,000 at the University of Detroit Stadium. Dutch Clark began the scoring late in the second quarter with a field goal from the 33-yard line.

At the start of the second half, Father Lumpkin returned the kickoff to Boston's 20-yard line. Frank Christensen scored a touchdown nine plays later on a short run.  On the next Detroit drive, the Lions gained 30 yards to Boston's 25-yard line on a pass from Clark to Harry Ebding. After an injury to Father Lumpkin, Ace Gutowsky entered the game and scored a touchdown on a six-yard run. 

In the fourth quarter, Ernie Caddel ran around the right end for a 52-yard gain to Boston's five-yard line. Glenn Presnell ran around the left end for the final touchdown. Clark added two extra points on drop-kicks, and Presnell placekicked another. On defense, the Detroit Free Press described the Lions play as "almost flawless". They held a Boston team featuring Cliff Battles to 112 total yards, as the Redskins attempted 16 passes, completed only three and had four passes intercepted.

The Lions' starting lineup against the Redskins was Harry Ebding (right end), George Christensen (right tackle), Ox Emerson (right guard), Clare Randolph (center), Maury Bodenger (left guard), Jack Johnson (left tackle), Bill McKalip (left end), Dutch Clark (quarterback), Ernie Caddell (right halfback), Father Lumpkin (left halfback), and Frank Christensen (fullback). Detroit substitutes who appeared in the game were John Schneller (right end), Glenn Presnell (right halfback), Buster Mitchell (left end), Chuck Bernard (center), Maury Bodenger (left guard), Ace Gutowsky (left halfback), Sam Knox (right tackle), Thomas Hupke (right guard), Bob Emerick (right tackle), Ray Richards (right guard), Bob Rowe (right halfback), and Bill McWilliams (left halfback).

Game 6: Brooklyn Dodgers

On October 22, in a Monday night game, the Lions defeated the Brooklyn Dodgers, 28–0, before a crowd of 11,000 at University of Detroit Stadium. After a scoreless first half, Dutch Clark scored three touchdowns in the third quarter and dropkicked three extra points. Clark's second touchdown came on a 72-yard run. His third touchdown came on a short run which was set up when Frank Christensen intercepted a pass and returned it to Brooklyn's three-yard line. In the fourth quarter, Glenn Presnell substituted for Clark at quarterback and scored a touchdown on a seven-yard run.

The Lions rushed for 257 yards in the game, and the Detroit Free Press credited Father Lumpkin: "Pop Lumpkin, Lion blocking back, clearly demonstrated Monday night that he is as good a blocking back as there is in the business. Pop boxed tackles, blocked ends, blocked for punt handlers and always was in front of the play in the secondary. Pop was in front of Clark clearing the way on every one of Dutch's brilliant runs."

On defense, the Lions held the Dodgers (featuring Shipwreck Kelly) to 56 rushing yards, and the Dodgers' leading passer Chris Cagle was unable to complete a single pass. As a team, the Dodgers completed one of 10 passes for five yards and had four passes intercepted by the Lions. A fight in the fourth quarter between Buster Mitchell and Ollie Sansen resulted in the ejection of both players. 

The Lions' starting lineup against the Dodgers was John Schneller (right end), George Christensen (right tackle), Ox Emerson (right guard), Clare Randolph (center), Thomas Hupke (left guard), Jack Johnson (left tackle), Buster Mitchell (left end), Dutch Clark (quarterback), Ernie Caddell (right halfback), Father Lumpkin (left halfback), and Frank Christensen (fullback). Detroit substitutes who appeared in the game were Harry Ebding (right end), Bill McKalip (left end), Maury Bodenger (left guard), Chuck Bernard (center), Glenn Presnell (right halfback), Ace Gutowsky (fullback), Sam Knox (right tackle), Bob Emerick (left tackle), Bob Rowe (left halfback), and Bill McWilliams (right halfback).

Game 7: at Cincinnati Reds

On October 28, 1934, the Lions defeated the Cincinnati Reds, 38–0, before a crowd of 5,000 in Portsmouth, Ohio. The game was described as a "home coming" for the Lions who had played in southern Ohio as the Portsmouth Spartans one year earlier. Led by Father Lumpkin's blocking, the Lions rushed for 373 yards. The Lions outgained the Reds by 485 yards (373 rushing and 112 passing) to 81 (60 rushing and 21 passing). Dutch Clark scored two touchdowns and kicked a field goal. Glenn Presnell scored a touchdown and kicked a field goal, and additional touchdowns were scored by Lumpkin and Ace Gutowsky. The Lions intercepted four Cincinnati passes, but were penalized six times for 60 yards.

The Lions' victory over the Reds extended the team's streak of shutout victories to seven games, tying an NFL record set by the 1921 Akron Pros. The record has not been matched since 1934.

The Lions' starting lineup against the Reds was Harry Ebding (right end), George Christensen (right tackle), Ox Emerson (right guard), Clare Randolph (center), Maury Bodenger (left guard), Jack Johnson (left tackle), Bill McKalip (left end), Dutch Clark (quarterback), Ernie Caddell (right halfback), Father Lumpkin (left halfback), and Ace Gutowsky (fullback). Detroit substitutions included ends Buster Mitchell and John Schneller, guards/tackles Sam Knox, Ray Richards and Bob Emerick, and backs Frank Christensen, Glenn Presnell, and Bill McWilliams.

Game 8: Pittsburgh Pirates
On November 4, 1934, the Lions defeated the Pittsburgh Pirates, 40–7. The Lions rushed for 426 yards against the Pirates, a total that remains a single-game NFL record.

Game 9: at Chicago Cardinals
On November 11, 1934, the Lions defeated the Chicago Cardinals, 17–13.

Game 10: St. Louis Gunners
On November 18, 1934, the Lions defeated the St. Louis Gunners, 40–7.

Game 11: Green Bay Packers

On November 25, 1934, the Lions lost to the Green Bay Packers, 3–0, in front of a crowd of 12,000 spectators in Detroit. Neither team scored in the first three quarters.  Clarke Hinkle kicked a 38-yard field goal in the fourth quarter.

The Lions' starting lineup against the Packers was Harry Ebding (right end), George Christensen (right tackle), Ox Emerson (right guard), Clare Randolph (center), Maury Bodenger (left guard), Jack Johnson (left tackle), Bill McKalip (left end), Glenn Presnell (quarterback), Ernie Caddell (right halfback), Father Lumpkin (left halfback), and Frank Christensen (fullback).

Game 12: Chicago Bears

On Thanksgiving Day, November 29, 1934, the Lions lost to the Chicago Bears, 19–16, before a record crowd of 26,000 at University of Detroit Stadium. With the victory, the Bears secured the NFL Western Division championship over the second-place Lions.

Detroit took a 16 to 7 lead at halftime, as Ace Gutowsky scored two touchdowns, Dutch Clark kicked an extra point, and Glenn Presnell kicked a 34-yard field goal. The Bears scored on two field goals by Jack Manders in the third quarter.  The winning score followed Joe Zeller's fourth-quarter interception of a Glenn Presnell pass that was returned to Detroit's four-yard line. Bronko Nagurski threw a game-winning touchdown pass to Bill Hewitt. The Lions rushed for 201 yards in the game and held the Bears to 116 rushing yards.

The Lions' starting lineup against the Bears was John Schneller (right end), George Christensen (right tackle), Ox Emerson (right guard), Chuck Bernard (center), Sam Knox (left guard), Jack Johnson (left tackle), Buster Mitchell (left end), Dutch Clark (quarterback), Ernie Caddell (right halfback), Father Lumpkin (left halfback), and Ace Gutowsky (fullback). Detroit substitutions included Curly Hinchman, Bob Rowe, Glenn Presnell, Harry Ebding, Bill McKalip, Clare Randolph, Maury Bodenger, Bob Emerick, and Ray Richards.

Game 13: at Chicago Bears

On Sunday, December 2, 1934, the Lions lost again to the Bears, this time by a 10–7 score at Wrigley Field in Chicago. In the first quarter, Chicago's George Musso blocked a Dutch Clark punt, and the Bears took over at Detroit's 27-yard line. Bronko Nagurski scored a touchdown, and Jack Manders kicked the extra point. Manders added a field goal in the second quarter. In the fourth quarter, Glenn Presnell ran 33 yards for a touchdown and kicked the extra point.

The Lions' starting lineup against the Bears was Harry Ebding (right end), Bob Emerick (right tackle), Sam Knox (right guard), Chuck Bernard (center), Ox Emerson (left guard), George Christensen (left tackle), Bill McKalip (left end), Dutch Clark (quarterback), Ernie Caddell (right halfback), Curly Hinchman (left halfback), and Ace Gutowsky (fullback).

Roster
 Chuck Bernard, center, kicker, punter, return specialist
 Maury Bodenger, left guard
 Ernie Caddel, wingback
 Frank Christensen, fullback
 George Christensen, right tackle
 Dutch Clark, tailback
 Harry Ebding, right end
 Bob Emerick, tackle
 Ox Emerson, right guard
 Ace Gutowsky, fullback
 Curly Hinchman, back
 Tom Hupke, guard
 Jack Johnson, left tackle
 Sam Knox, guard
 Russ Lay
 Father Lumpkin, blocking back
 Bill McKalip, left end
 Bill McWilliams
 Buster Mitchell, left end
 Glenn Presnell, tailback
 Clare Randolph, center
 Ray Richards
 Bob Rowe
 John Schneller, right end

Awards and records

Eight Lions received All-Pro honors in 1934 as follows:
 Quarterback Dutch Clark: NFL (1st team); United Press (1st team); Collyer's Eye (1st team); Green Bay Press-Gazette (1st team); and Chicago Daily News (1st team).
 Guard Ox Emerson: NFL (2nd team); United Press (1st team); Collyer's Eye (1st team); Chicago Daily News (1st team)
 Tackle George Christensen: NFL (1st team); United Press (2nd team); Collyer's Eye (1st team); Green Bay Press-Gazette (2nd team)
 End Bill McKalip: NFL (2nd team); United Press (2nd team); Green Bay Press-Gazette (1st team); Chicago Daily News (2nd team)
 Halfback Glenn Presnell: United Press (2nd team); Chicago Daily News (2nd team)
 End Buster Mitchell: United Press (1st team)
 End Harry Ebding: NFL (2nd team)
 Fullback Ace Gutowsky: NFL (2nd team)

References

External links
 1934 Detroit Lions on Pro Football Reference
 1934 Detroit Lions on jt-sw.com
 1934 Detroit Lions on The Football Database

Detroit Lions
Detroit Lions seasons
Detroit Lions